Belletre may refer to:
 Beletre, officer
 Belletrism (from Fr. "Belles-Lettres" writing style, poetry)